Mustacciuoli (also known as mustaccioli or mostaccioli) is a traditional pastry from Naples, usually served at Christmas time.

Description
Mustaccioli takes the form of a parallelogram, and consist of a soft, spiced, cake-like interior, covered in chocolate. In recent years, they are many variations of mostaccioli sold in Naples, where the chocolate glaze may be replaced by a white chocolate frosting or icing sugar and candied fruit. Mustacciolis are often sold alongside other Neapolitan sweets including Roccocò, raffiuoli, susamielli, and struffoli at Christmas time.

History
Neapolitan mostacciolis were mentioned by Bartolomeo Scappi, personal cook of Pope Pius V as part of his pranzo alli XVIII di ottobre (October 18 lunch).

Etymology
The term mustacciuoli derives from the Latin mustaceus and is prey to various paretimologies. Some say it derives from the Latin mustum, linked to the use of must in some ancient recipes as a sweetener., others from mustax, which is a type of laurel. Originally the  mustaceum was a wedding cake, wrapped in bay leaves that gave aroma during cooking. Hence the proverb loreolam in mustace quaerere, that is: to look uselessly in the focaccia for burnt bay leaves. Another origin could derive from the ancient Greek μάσταξ (mástax)  which means morsels, similar to μαστάζω (mastázō) which means to chew or eat.

Related sweets in other regions
 'Nzuddha: version in Calabria
 Mustazzoli: version in Salento

References

Chocolate desserts
Christmas food
Cookies
Italian desserts
Neapolitan cuisine